Philippe Gardent (born 15 March 1964) is a French handball player who won a bronze medal at the 1992 Olympics. He played six matches and scored 16 goals. He was the captain of the French teams that won the world title in 1995 and placed second in 1993. Since retiring from competitions in 1996 he worked as a handball coach, with Chambéry Savoie Handball (1996–2012), Paris Saint-Germain Handball (2012–2015) and Fenix Toulouse Handball (since 2015).

References

1964 births
Living people
French male handball players
Olympic handball players of France
Handball players at the 1992 Summer Olympics
Olympic bronze medalists for France
Olympic medalists in handball
Medalists at the 1992 Summer Olympics
Sportspeople from Rhône (department)